Manos is an album by The Spinanes, released on October 26, 1993, on Sub Pop Records. Soon after its release, it became the first album released on an independent label to top the American college charts.

Manos was re-issued in 2018 by Merge Records.

Track listing
 "Entire" – 2:28
 "Noel, Jonah and Me" – 3:25
 "Spitfire" – 3:10
 "Love that Party with the Monkey Kitty" – 2:46
 "Uneasy" – 2:39
 "Epiphany" – 5:15
 "Manos" – 4:26
 "Dangle" – 3:01
 "Basement Galaxy" – 3:31
 "Grand Prize" – 3:21
 "Sunday" – 2:54
 "Shellburn" – 5:02

References

External links
 "Noel, Jonah, and Me" music video (from "Manos")
 "Sunday" music video (from "Manos")

1993 debut albums
The Spinanes albums
Sub Pop albums